Yancoub Meité (born 10 February 1990) is a professional footballer who plays as a defensive midfielder for Swiss team FC Martigny-Sports. Born in France, he represented the Ivory Coast at youth levels U20 and U23.

Club career
Born in Paris, Meité made his Ligue 2 debut at Tours FC during the 2011–12 season.

International career
Meité was born in France to parents of Ivorian descent, and has represented the Ivory Coast U20s, and the Ivory Coast U23 team.

References

1990 births
Living people
French sportspeople of Ivorian descent
Footballers from Paris
Association football midfielders
Ivorian footballers
French footballers
FC Sion players
Tours FC players
AS Cannes players
FC Lausanne-Sport players
FC Le Mont players
Ligue 2 players
Championnat National players
Swiss Super League players
Swiss Challenge League players
Ivorian expatriate footballers
French expatriate footballers
Ivorian expatriate sportspeople in Switzerland
French expatriate sportspeople in Switzerland
Expatriate footballers in Switzerland